Hidden Treasures was a short-lived breakfast cereal by General Mills. Introduced in 1993, alongside Sprinkle Spangles, the cereal consisted of sweetened corn squares that all looked the same, but were meant to be filled with a fruity filling. The icing filling flavors were cherry, orange and grape. To emphasize the treasure hunt dynamic, some pieces had no icing filling and were hollow. Pieces with a seam very close to the edge had a grape filling, off-center seams had orange, and directly center seams had cherry. Hidden Treasures was discontinued by 1995.

Mascot 
Since Hidden Treasures was so short-lived, only two commercials were made for it. A temporary mascot was made for the first commercial, a robot named H.T. – H.T. was said to have been programmed to try to figure out what was inside each of the cereal's pieces. He was dropped when the final commercial aired.

See also

 List of defunct consumer brands

References

General Mills cereals
Discontinued products
Products introduced in 1993
Products and services discontinued in 1995